Dastgerd (also Romanized as Dastgird and Dastīgerd; also known as Dastgerd Shahabad) is a village in Alqurat Rural District of the Central District of Birjand County, South Khorasan province, Iran. At the 2006 National Census, its population was 296 in 91 households. The following census in 2011 counted 1,328 people in 373 households. The latest census in 2016 showed a population of 3,365 people in 898 households; it was the largest village in its rural district.

References 

Birjand County

Populated places in South Khorasan Province

Populated places in Birjand County